κ Delphini (Latinised as Kappa Delphini, abbreviated to κ Del or kappa Del) is a binary star system in the constellation Delphinus. It is faintly visible to the naked eye, with an apparent magnitude of 5.05. It is located about 98.8 light-years away, based on its parallax.

Kappa Delphini is an astrometric binary. The primary star is an early G-type subgiant star. It has a mass 1.61 times that of the Sun, and is 6.8 times more luminous. The companion star regularly perturbs the G-type primary star primary, causing it to wobble around the barycenter. From this, an orbital period of 45 years has been calculated. The secondary star is a low-mass star, at only .

References

Delphini, Kappa
Delphinus (constellation)
G-type subgiants
K-type subgiants
196755
7896
101916
Delphini, 07
Durchmusterung objects
Astrometric binaries